Pop Always Pays is a 1940 American comedy film directed by Leslie Goodwins using a screenplay by Charles E. Roberts, based on a story by Arthur J. Beckhard. Although not credited in the film, news reports of the time reported that when Goodwins fell ill during the filming, the screenwriter, Roberts, assumed directing duties. The film stars Leon Errol, Dennis O'Keefe, Adele Pearce, and Walter Catlett, and was released by RKO Radio Pictures on June 21, 1940.

Cast
 Leon Errol as 	Henry Brewster
 Dennis O'Keefe as 	Jeff Thompson
 Pamela Blake as 	Edna Brewster 
 Walter Catlett as 	Tommy Lane
 Marjorie Gateson as 	Mrs. Brewster
 Tom Kennedy as 	Murphy
 Robert Middlemass as 	Mr. Oberton
 Effie Anderson as Mary
 Erskine Sanford as 	John Hayes
 Vivien Oakland as 	Mrs. Violet Oberton

References

External links

1940 films
American black-and-white films
RKO Pictures films
1940 comedy films
American comedy films
Films produced by Bert Gilroy
Films directed by Leslie Goodwins
Films scored by Paul Sawtell
1940s English-language films
1940s American films